Gilbert H. Peña (born 1949) was a Republican member of the Texas House of Representatives from District 144 in Harris County, Texas.

Background

Political life

References

1949 births
Living people
Republican Party members of the Texas House of Representatives
Texas Southern University alumni
American politicians of Mexican descent
Hispanic and Latino American state legislators in Texas
People from Galveston, Texas
People from Houston
21st-century American politicians